The 2006 IIHF World U18 Championships were held in Ängelholm and Halmstad, Sweden. The championships began on April 12, 2006 and finished on April 22, 2006. Games were played at Ängelholms Ishall in Ängelholm and Sannarps Isstadion in Halmstad. The United States of America defeated Finland 3–1 in the final to claim the gold medal, while the Czech Republic defeated Canada 4–1 to capture the bronze medal.

Championship results

Preliminary round

Group A

Results

Group B

Results

Relegation round

Results

Final round

Quarterfinals

Semifinals

Fifth place game

Bronze medal game

Gold medal game

Final standings

Scoring leaders

Goaltending leaders

(Minimum 60 minutes played)

Division I

Division I consisted of two separate tournaments. The Group A tournament was held between 3 and 9 April 2006 in Miskolc, Hungary and the Group B tournament was held between 2 and 8 April 2006 in Riga, Latvia. Switzerland and Latvia won the Group A and Group B tournaments respectively and gained promotion to the Championship Division for the 2007 IIHF World U18 Championships. While Hungary finished last in Group A and South Korea last in Group B and were both relegated to Division II for 2007.

Final standings

Group A
 — promoted to Championship Division for 2007

 — relegated to Division II for 2007

Group B
 — promoted to Championship Division for 2007

 — relegated to Division II for 2007

Division II

Division II consisted of two separate tournaments. The Group A tournament was held between 2 and 8 April 2006 in Merano, Italy and the Group B tournament was held between 15 and 21 March 2006 in Elektrėnai and Kaunas, Lithuania. Italy and Great Britain won the Group A and Group B tournaments respectively and gained promotion to Division I for the 2007 IIHF World U18 Championships. While Spain finished last in Group A and Iceland last in Group B and were both relegated to Division III for 2007.

Final standings

Group A
 — promoted to Division I for 2007

 Serbia and Montenegro
 — relegated to Division III for 2007

Group B
 — promoted to Division I for 2007

 — relegated to Division III for 2007

Division III

The Division III tournament was held between 13 and 19 March 2006 in Miercurea-Ciuc, Romania. Romania and Israel finished first and second respectively and both gained promotion to Division II for the 2007 IIHF World U18 Championships. While Bulgaria finished fifth and Turkey sixth and were relegated to the 2007 Division III Qualification tournament.

Final standings
 — promoted to Division II for 2007
 — promoted to Division II for 2007

 — relegated to Division III Qualification for 2007
 — relegated to Division III Qualification for 2007

References

External links
Official results and statistics from the International Ice Hockey Federation
Championship
Division I – Group A
Division I – Group B
Division II – Group A
Division II – Group B
Division III

 
IIHF World U18 Championships
IIHF World U18 Championships
World
2006
April 2006 sports events in Europe
Sports competitions in Ängelholm
Sports competitions in Halmstad